Seán Francis MacEntee (23 August 1889 – 9 January 1984) was an Irish Fianna Fáil politician who served as Tánaiste from 1959 to 1965, Minister for Social Welfare from 1957 to 1961, Minister for Health from 1957 to 1965, Minister for Local Government and Public Health from 1941 to 1948, Minister for Industry and Commerce from 1939 to 1941, Minister for Finance from 1932 to 1939 and 1951 to 1954. He served as a Teachta Dála (TD) from 1918 to 1969. At the time of his death, he was the last surviving member of the First Dáil.

Early life
Born as John McEntee at 47 King Street, Belfast on 23 August 1889, the son of James McEntee, a publican, and his wife, Mary Owens, both of whom were from Monaghan. In 1901 and 1911, the family's address was 49 King Street. James McEntee was a prominent Nationalist member of Belfast Corporation and a close friend of Joe Devlin MP.

MacEntee was educated at St Mary's Christian Brothers School, St Malachy's College and the Belfast Municipal College of Technology where he qualified as an electrical engineer. His early political involvement was with the Irish Socialist Republican Party in Belfast city. He quickly rose through the ranks of the trade union movement becoming junior representative in the city's shipyards. Following his education MacEntee worked as an engineer in Dundalk, County Louth, and was involved in the establishment of a local corps of the Irish Volunteers in the town. He mobilised in Dundalk and fought in the General Post Office Garrison in the Easter Rising in 1916. He was sentenced to death for his part in the rising.  This sentence was later commuted to life imprisonment. MacEntee was released in the general amnesty in 1917, and was later elected a member of the National Executives of both Sinn Féin and the Irish Volunteers in October 1917. MacEntee was later elected Sinn Féin Member of Parliament (MP) for Monaghan South at the 1918 general election.

Rebellion years
An attempt to develop his career as a consulting engineer in Belfast was interrupted by the War of Independence in 1919. MacEntee served as Vice-Commandant of the Belfast Brigade of the Irish Republican Army. He was also a member of the Volunteer Executive, a sort of Cabinet and Directory for the Minister for Defence and the HQ Staff But MacEntee remained one of the few Sinn Féiners from the north. On 6 August 1920, MacEntee presented 'a Memorial' lecture to the Dáil from the Belfast Corporation. He told the Dáil it was the only custodian of public order, and that a Nationalist pogrom was taking place, he advised them to fight Belfast. The Dáil government's policy was dubbedHibernia Irredenta or 'Greening Ireland'. Sean MacEntee was asked to resign his South Monaghan seat, after voting against a bunting celebration in Lurgan to mark the signing of the Anglo-Irish Treaty.

Path to civil war
From April 1921, when MacEntee was transferred to Dublin to direct a special anti-partition campaign in connection with the May general election. It remained Collins policy, he declared, that the largely Protestant shipyard workers of Belfast were being directed by the British, urging all Irishmen to rejoin the Republic. Correspondingly the Ulster Unionist Council rejected the call for a review of the boundary commission decision made on Northern Ireland. But when Ulstermen chose James Craig as Premier, Collins denounced democracy in the north as a sham. It was on the partition of Ireland issue that MacEntee voted against the Anglo-Irish Treaty of 1921. During the subsequent Civil War MacEntee commanded the IRA unit in Marlboro Street Post Office in Dublin. He later fought with Cathal Brugha in the Hamman Hotel, and was subsequently interned in Kilmainham and Gormanstown until December 1923.

Politician in the Free State
After his release from prison, MacEntee devoted himself more fully to his engineering practice, although he unsuccessfully contested Dublin County by-election of 1924. He became a founder-member of Fianna Fáil in 1926 and was eventually elected a TD for Dublin County at the 1927 general election.

MacEntee founded the Association of Patent Agents in 1929, having gained his interest in Patents when he worked as an assistant engineer in Dundalk Urban District Council. On MacEntee's appointment as Minister for Finance in 1932, his colleague, Francis Litton who was acting as Secretary of the Association, circulated the members with a notice to the effect that the Association was "suspended" until such time as MacEntee could return as he now had to devote his energies to the affairs of the State. However, the other members decided to carry on. MacEntee must have valued his status as a Patent Agent since he maintained his name on the Register for over 30 years while he held Ministerial rank in the Irish Government, although he is not thought to have taken any active part in the patent business, which was carried on by his business partners.

In the first Fianna Fáil government (1932–1948)
In 1932, Fianna Fáil came to power for the very first time, with MacEntee becoming Minister for Finance. In keeping with the party's protectionist economic policies his first budget in March of that year saw the introduction of new duties on forty-three imports, many of them coming from Britain. This saw retaliation from the British government, which in turn provoked a response from the Irish government. This was the beginning of the Economic War between the two nations, however, a treaty in 1938, signed by MacEntee and other senior members who brought an end to the issue.

During the Dáil debates on the Constitution of Ireland in 1937, MacEntee described it as 'the Constitution of a Catholic State'.

In 1939, World War II broke out and a cabinet reshuffle resulted in MacEntee being appointed as Minister for Industry and Commerce, taking over from his rival Seán Lemass. During his tenure at this department MacEntee introduced the important Trade Union Act (1941). In 1941, another reshuffle of ministers took place, with MacEntee becoming Minister for Local Government and Public Health. The Health portfolio was transferred to a new Department of Health in 1947. Following the 1948 general election, Fianna Fáil returned to the opposition benches for the first time in sixteen years.

Later Fianna Fáil governments (1951–1954, 1957–1965)
In 1951, Fianna Fáil were back in government, although in minority status, depending on independent deputies for survival. MacEntee once again returned to the position of Minister for Finance where he felt it was vital to deal with the balance of payments deficit. He brought in a harsh budget in 1951 which raised income tax and tariffs on imports. His chief aim was to cut spending and reduce imports, however, this came at a cost as unemployment increased sharply. The increases were retained in his next two budgets in 1952 and 1953. It is often said that it was MacEntee's performance during this period that cost Fianna Fáil the general election in 1954. The poor grasp on economics also did his political career tremendous damage as up to that point he was seen as a likely successor as Taoiseach.  Now, however, Seán Lemass was firmly seen as the "heir apparent".

In 1957, Fianna Fáil returned to power with an overall majority with MacEntee being appointed Minister for Health. The financial and economic portfolios were dominated by Lemass and other like-minded ministers who wanted to move away from protection to free trade. He is credited during this period with the reorganisation of the health services, the establishment of separate departments of health and social welfare, and the fluoridation of water supplies in Ireland. In 1959, MacEntee became Tánaiste when Seán Lemass was elected Taoiseach.

Retirement and death
Following the 1965 general election, MacEntee was 76 years old and retired from the government. This did not mean that he went quietly to the backbenches. He re-emerged in 1966 to launch a verbal attack on Seán Lemass for deciding to step down as party leader and Taoiseach. The two men, however, patched up their differences shortly afterwards. MacEntee retired from Dáil Éireann in 1969 at the age of 80, making him the oldest TD in Irish history.

He had a negative view of the Provisional IRA.

MacEntee served in the Parliamentary Assembly of the Council of Europe and repeatedly proposed amendments that would have watered down resolutions against the Greek junta (see Greek case).

MacEntee died in Dublin on 9 January 1984, at the age of 94.

Family
In June 1921, he had married a strongly nationalistic woman from County Tipperary, Margaret Browne (1893–1976), who later taught Irish at Alexandra College and then at UCD. Among Margaret's brothers were Cardinal Michael Browne, poet and academic Monsignor Pádraig de Brún, and author Monsignor Maurice Browne. One of Seán and Margaret's daughters was the Irish poet Máire Mhac an tSaoi (1922 - 2021). She was married to the politician Conor Cruise O'Brien until his death. Their other daughter was Barbara MacEntee-Biggar (1928–1995), who was married to Irish Ambassador Frank Biggar (1917–1974); Barbara and Frank's eldest son is former Irish ambassador John Biggar (1952–). Seán and Margaret also had a son, Seamus MacEntee (1924–2000), who lived mostly in England, working as a psychiatrist, as well as being an artist painting under the name Sagesson ("Sage's son" is an English translation of the name MacEntee, which is an anglicisation of the Irish Mac an tSaoi, meaning "Son of the wise man").

References

Bibliographical sources
 Beaslai, Piaras, Michael Collins and the Making of a New Ireland 2 vols, (Dublin 1926)
 Boyce, George D & Alan O' Day (eds.) The Ulster Crisis 1885–1921 (Basingstoke 2006)
 Coogan, Tim Pat, Michael Collins: A biography (London 1990)
 Costello, Francis, Enduring the Most: The Life and Death of Terence MacSwiney (Dingle 1995)
 Curran, Joseph, The Birth of the Irish Free State (Tuscaloosa, Ala, USA 1980)
 Doherty, Gabriel & Dermot Keogh (eds) Michael Collins and the Making of the Irish State (Cork 1998)
 Farrell, Brian, Creation of the Dail (Dublin 1994)
 Original from the University of Michigan. Digitized 30 Jun 2010
 Foy, Michael T., Michael Collins' Intelligence War: The Struggle between the British and the IRA 1919–1921 (Stroud 2006)
 Lynch, Robert, The Northern IRA and the Early Years of Partition, 1920–1922 (Dublin 2006)
 McDermott, Jim, Northern Divisions: The Old IRA and the Belfast Pogroms 1920–22 (Belfast 2001)
 Morgan, Austen, Labour and Partition: The Belfast Working Class 1905–23 (London 1990)
 Phoenix, Eamon, Northern Nationalism: Nationalist Politics, Partition and the Catholic Minority in Northern Ireland, 1890–1940 (Belfast 1994)

External links
 

1889 births
1984 deaths
Politicians from Belfast
People educated at St. Mary's Christian Brothers' Grammar School, Belfast
Ministers for Finance (Ireland)
Fianna Fáil TDs
Irish Republican Army (1919–1922) members
Irish Republican Army (1922–1969) members
Irish republicans interned without trial
Irish poets
Tánaistí
People of the Irish Civil War (Anti-Treaty side)
Members of the Parliament of the United Kingdom for County Monaghan constituencies (1801–1922)
UK MPs 1918–1922
Members of the 1st Dáil
Members of the 2nd Dáil
Members of the 5th Dáil
Members of the 6th Dáil
Members of the 7th Dáil
Members of the 8th Dáil
Members of the 9th Dáil
Members of the 10th Dáil
Members of the 11th Dáil
Members of the 12th Dáil
Members of the 13th Dáil
Members of the 14th Dáil
Members of the 15th Dáil
Members of the 16th Dáil
Members of the 17th Dáil
Members of the 18th Dáil
Prisoners sentenced to death by the United Kingdom
Irish prisoners sentenced to death
Early Sinn Féin TDs
Presidential appointees to the Council of State (Ireland)
People educated at St Malachy's College
Ministers for Health (Ireland)
Ministers for Social Affairs (Ireland)
20th-century Irish poets
20th-century male writers
Ministers for Enterprise, Trade and Employment